Marcello Provenzale (1575–1639) was an Italian painter.

He was born at Cento. He was a pupil of the fellow painter from Cento, Paolo Rossetti, but is chiefly distinguished for his talents as a mosaicist. Giovanni Baglione describes several of his works at Rome, executed under the direction of Paul V, among which is the portrait of that pontiff. In conjunction with Rossetti, he executed several mosaics in the Capella Clementina, in St. Peter's basilica, from the cartoons of Cristofano Roncalli and for the Cardinal Scipione Borghese. He died in Rome.

References
    

16th-century Italian painters
Italian male painters
17th-century Italian painters
Italian Baroque painters
1575 births
1639 deaths